Skenella paludinoides is a species of minute sea snail, a marine gastropod mollusk in the family Cingulopsidae.

Description

Distribution

References

 Ponder, W. F. (1983) Rissoaform gastropods from the Antarctic and sub-Antarctic: the Eatoniellidae, Rissoidae, Barleeidae, Cingulopsidae, Orbitestellidae and Rissoellidae (Mollusca: Gastropoda) of Signy Island, South Orkney Islands, with a review of the Antarctic and sub-Antarctic (excluding southern South America and the New Zealand sub-Antarctic islands) species. British Antarctic Survey, Scientific Reports 108: 1–96

External links
 Antarctic invertebrates: Skenella paludinoides

Cingulopsidae
Gastropods described in 1902